Operation Houndsworth was the codename for a British Special Air Service operation during the Second World War. The operation carried out by 'A' Squadron, 1st Special Air Service between 6 June and 6 September 1944, was centred on Dijon in the Burgundy region of France. Their objective was to disrupt German lines of communication, coordinate the activities of the French Resistance and prevent German reinforcements moving to the Normandy beachheads, especially the 2nd SS Panzer Division Das Reich.

Background
The men involved in Operation Houndsworth were part of the Special Air Service Brigade. The Special Air Service (SAS) was a unit of the British Army during the Second World War, formed in July 1941 by David Stirling and originally called "L" Detachment, Special Air Service Brigade"L" being an attempt at deception implying the existence of numerous such units. It was conceived as a commando type force to operate behind enemy lines in the North African Campaign.  

In 1944 the Special Air Service Brigade was formed and consisted of the British 1st and 2nd Special Air Service, the French 3rd and 4th Special Air Service and the Belgian 5th Special Air Service. They were to undertake parachute operations behind the German lines in France, and then carry out operations supporting the Allied advance through Belgium, the Netherlands, and eventually into Germany.

In May 1944 the Supreme Headquarters Allied Expeditionary Force (SHAEF) had issued an order for the Special Air Service Brigade to carry out two operations in France. The two operations were Operation Houndsworth in the area of Dijon given 'A' Squadron 1st Special Air Service and Operation Bulbasket in the area of Poitiers  given to 'B' Squadron 1st Special Air Service.

The focus of both operations would be the disruption of German reinforcements from the south of France to the Normandy beachheads. To carry out the operation they would destroy supply dumps, block the two railway lines between Paris–Lyons–Chalon-sur-Saône and Paris–Le Creusot–Nevers. One unit they especially wanted to delay was the 2nd SS Panzer Division Das Reich which was based in the area around Toulouse in the south of France. The intelligence experts at SHAEF responsible for planning the Normandy landings, had estimated it would take three days for the panzer division to reach Normandy.

Mission

Operation Houndsworth consisted of 18 officers and 126 men of 'A' Squadron, 1st Special Air Service (SAS).  The SAS reconnaissance party landed in the area on 6 June 1944. They were followed by the rest of the squadron under the command of Major Bill Fraser over the night of 10/11 June 1944. A number of Jeeps armed with Vickers K machine guns were also parachuted in.  The squadron was established in a patrol base in the mountainous wooded countryside southwest of Dijon in the Monts du Morvan in the Nièvre department.

The SAS expanded their operations further to the south near Dijon with Operation Wallace which took the pressure off Houndsworth.

The Squadron then proceeded with operations during which the Lyon to Paris rail lines were blown up 22 times. After one occasion a member of the French resistance approached the workmen repairing the lines and asked how long the repairs would take. Becoming aware of his loyalties they suggested that if the line had been cut further up more damage could have been caused. They then proceeded to draw him a diagram suggesting exactly where to do it next time. 

The squadron also killed or wounded 220 Germans, captured 132 prisoners of war, and identified 30 targets for Royal Air Force interdiction. The operation was not without loss to the SAS; during the operation, they lost eight men wounded and ten men killed. The success of the operation resulted in the Germans retaliating against local villages. The residents of  Dun-les-Places, Montsauche-les-Settons and Planchez all suffered and a number of residents were murdered during German reprisals.

The Germans eventually became aware of the location of the SAS camp and started what they thought would be a surprise attack on 20 August 1944. Unknown to them, members of the French resistance knew about the attack, and Corporal David Danger of the SAS got through the cordon the Germans had put around the camp and was able to warn the squadron. Pre-warned, the SAS fought off the Germans.

Operation Houndsworth ended in September 1944.  Danger was awarded the Military Medal on 29 March 1945 for his part in foiling the attack on the camp, and his skill in maintaining radio communication from behind enemy lines for four months.

References
Notes

Bibliography
 
 
 
 
 
 
 

Conflicts in 1944
Code names
Operation Overlord
Military operations of World War II involving Germany
World War II British Commando raids
Special Air Service